Martin Luther Christian University was established in July 2005. The university is named after Martin Luther (1483–1546), the father of reformation. MLCU is the first Christian university in India after more than two centuries of Christian education in the country that does not focus on theological training. The creation and functioning of the university is in accordance with the University Grants Commission Act, 1956, under Section 2(f).

Sponsors
Martin Luther Christian University was sponsored by the National Lutheran Health and Medical Board of the United Evangelical Lutheran Church of India and the Khasi-Jaintia Presbyterian Assembly of the Presbyterian Church of India.

Accreditation
Martin Luther Christian University was created by Act No. 11 of 2005 of the Legislative Assembly of Meghalaya. The Government of Meghalaya issued the Gazette Notification on February 22, 2006. The creation of the university is in accordance with the University Grant Commission Act, 1956 under Section 2(f) and the university is empowered to grant degrees under Section 22 of the UGC Act.

The university is accredited by the Pharmacy Council of India (PCI) and Indian Nursing Council (INC).

Academics/Curriculum
The university contribute to the sustainable development of the region, participating in vocational education, health care, information and communication networks, agri-sciences, environmental protection, disaster education, peace studies and developmental projects. Spheres of learning range from Allied Health Sciences, Educational Psychology(M.A.) and Clinical Psychology (PGDipClinPsyc  - 2 year), Environmental studies, Business/Management, Family Financial Planning (Diploma), Social Work, Music, Culinary Arts, etc.

Experiential learning
Experiential Learning is one of the core pillars of the curriculum of all the courses in MLCU. An academic degree for MLCU is a 50:50 pragmatic ratio of both theoretical and applicable knowledge. Thus, the functional aspects are learned through experiential learning, and the curriculums are developed from the thought that education is a process taking place in the classroom, and in the community. The experiential learning consists of creating a strong student-industry relationship in forms of fieldwork, internship and externships for the same the university have formed collaborations with relevant NGOs, industries, hospitals and hotels and other organizations. This also includes Field trips for industry induction, they are organized both inside and outside the state, to expose students to challenges and developmental activities going in the country.

Controversy
Local sponsors Khasi-Jaintia Presbyterian Assembly of Presbyterian Church of India withdrew its sponsorship to the university college in 2014. Martin Luther Christian University has been chargesheeted by CBI for misappropriation of funds sanctioned by North Eastern Council for establishment of North East Careers Institute. However, MLCU keeps its UGC accreditation due to its significance in the sector.

References

See also
 William Carey University

Educational institutions established in 2005
Universities in Meghalaya
Martin Luther
Private universities in India
2005 establishments in Meghalaya